Herman Melville House may refer to:
Arrowhead (Herman Melville House), in Pittsfield, Massachusetts
Herman Melville House (Troy, New York)